Vinicia is a genus of moths belonging to the family Pyralidae.

The species of this genus are found in Australia and New Zealand.

Species:
 Vinicia eucometis Meyrick, 1882 
 Vinicia guttella Snellen, 1882

References

Pyralidae
Moth genera